The Ocarina (German: Die Okarina) is a 1919 German silent drama film directed by Uwe Jens Krafft and starring Conrad Veidt, Charlotte Böcklin and Rudolf Lettinger.

Cast
 Charlotte Böcklin
 Rudolf Lettinger
 Conrad Veidt as Jaap

References

Bibliography
 John T. Soister. Conrad Veidt on Screen: A Comprehensive Illustrated Filmography. McFarland, 2002.

External links

1919 films
Films of the Weimar Republic
German silent feature films
Films directed by Uwe Jens Krafft
German drama films
1919 drama films
German black-and-white films
Seafaring films
Silent drama films
Silent adventure films
1910s German films